Miroslav Spalajković (18 April 1869 – 4 February 1951) was a Serbian diplomat, best known for his actions as the envoy to the Russian Empire in Saint Petersburg during the July Crisis of the summer of 1914. An outspoken opponent of Austria-Hungary, Spalajković's public statements to Russian media denied any Serbian culpability in the assassination of Archduke Franz Ferdinand of Austria and his reports back to the Serbian government guaranteed Russian military support. While Czar Nicholas II and much of the Russian leadership was committed to Serbian autonomy , no Russian leader actually guaranteed Spalajković or Serbia of Russian military support during the July Crisis. Spalajković's optimistic telegrams, largely based on public demonstrations and uncorroborated discussion, reassured the Serbian government that they could risk an Austro-Hungarian military attack. Without Spalajković's guarantee of Russian support, some historians argue that Serbian Prime Minister Nikola Pašić would have ultimately yielded to Austrian demands, thereby avoiding the sequence of events that led to the First World War.

References

Footnotes 

1869 births
1951 deaths
Serbian people of World War I
Ambassadors of Serbia to Russia
Ambassadors of Yugoslavia to France